This is the family tree of Sinhalese monarchs.

Key

House of Vijaya

The House of Vijaya claimed a close relationship to the Shakya dynasty, family of the Gautama Buddha.

House of Lambakanna I

House of Moriya

House of Lambakanna II

House of Vijayabahu

House of Kalinga

House of Siri Sanga Bo

House of Dinajara

Nayaks of Kandy

See also
 List of Sri Lankan monarchs

Notes

References

External links
 Genealogy of the House of Vijaya

Family tree
Family trees
Dynasty genealogy